St Michael's Church is an Anglican parish church in Coxwold, North Yorkshire, England. The Parish of Coxwold is part of the Church of England's Diocese of York.

The earliest church on the site dates to the Anglo-Saxon period. That church was replaced by a Norman one built in the 11th century, and that in turn was replaced with the present church which was built by 1430. The church is in the Perpendicular style, and among its unusual features are an octagonal tower and a tongue-shaped altar rail. The church is a grade I listed building.

Gallery

References

15th-century church buildings in England
Grade I listed churches in North Yorkshire
English Gothic architecture in North Yorkshire
Hambleton District